Zakynthos International Airport "Dionysios Solomos"  is an airport in Zakynthos, Greece.

History 
In December 2015, the privatization of Zakynthos International Airport and 13 other regional airports of Greece was finalized with the signing of the agreement between the Fraport AG/Copelouzos Group joint venture and the state privatisation fund. "We signed the deal today," the head of Greece's privatisation agency HRADF, Stergios Pitsiorlas, told Reuters. According to the agreement, the joint venture will operate the 14 airports (including Zakynthos International Airport) for 40 years from 11 April 2017.

The airport is close to the town and beach of Kalamaki. Kalamaki beach is part of the National Marine Park of Zakynthos. The endangered loggerhead sea turtles (Caretta caretta) lay their eggs at the beaches of the marine park at night during the summer months. This has resulted in aircraft movement restrictions. Flights are not permitted to take off or land between 10:00PM to 5:00AM. It is at the jurisdiction of the Greek authorities to allow aircraft movements at night under extenuating circumstances. The airport opened in 1972. An expansion of the airport's apron area to 35,100 m2 was completed in 2003, and a new 22,150 m2 terminal building was completed in 2008. The airport is 4.3 km from Zakynthos town and other seaside tourist destinations such as Laganas, Tsilivi and Kalamaki. The main approach into the airport is Runway 34. Aircraft usually have to fly over Laganas bay and make a 180-degree turn, before their final approach over sunbathing tourists on the busy Kalamaki beach.

Fraport Greece's investment plan 

On 22 March 2017, Fraport Greece presented its master plan for the 14 regional airports, including the Zakynthos International Airport.

Immediate actions that were implemented at airports operated by Fraport Greece, before the launch of the 2017 summer season, included:

 General clean-up
 Improving lighting, marking of airside areas
 Upgrading sanitary facilities
 Enhancing services and offering a new free Internet connection (WiFi)
 Implementing works to improve fire safety in all the areas of the airports

Specifically for Zakynthos International Airport, the following changes were implemented under Fraport Greece's investment plan:

 Refurbishing and remodeling current terminal
 HBS inline screening
 Refurbishing air traffic control tower
 New fire station
 Relocating power transformers and generators
 Reorganizing airport apron area
 Refurbishing airside pavement
 Reorganizing landside roads & parking
 New security guardhouse
 33 percent increase in check-in counters (from 15 to 20)
 150 percent increase in the number of security-check lanes (from 2 to 5)

Airlines and destinations
The following airlines operate regular scheduled and charter flights at Zakynthos Airport:

Traffic figures

The following data are from the official website of the airport:

Traffic statistics by country (2022)

See also
Transport in Greece

References

External links
 Zakynthos International Airport

Airports in Greece
Zakynthos
Transport in the Ionian Islands (region)